The White Eagle Museum is a Polish military museum located in the town of Skarżysko-Kamienna in the central Świętokrzyskie Voivodeship, opened in 1969.

Museum
The museum has a large collection of Russian, Polish and German World War II and post-war military equipment. The military equipment is displayed in a permanent outdoor exhibition covering , and includes tanks, artillery pieces, armoured vehicles, rockets and aircraft. The museum also collects documents and historical materials relating to the history of the city and the region, and objects related to military history from World War II onwards.

The museum is housed in the former residence of the superintendent of the Rejów foundry, which was built in 1836–1838. It houses exhibitions pertaining to local industry, including Państwowa Fabryka Amunicji (The National Ammunition Factory). During World War II, the munitions factory was taken over by the German company, HASAG, and used forced labour. Members of a local resistance group Orzel Bialy (White Eagle) were captured, shot and buried in two mass graves in nearby forests. The museum commemorates them, and the thousands of unprotected forced labourers poisoned by picric acid fumes used in ammunition production. There are other exhibits on the Leśni partisans, the People's Army of Poland and the Polish Army in the West.

Exhibits
The exhibits include:
 T-34-85 tank
 BTR-60 armoured personnel carrier
 CW-34 armoured recovery vehicle
 Katyusha rocket launcher
 StuG IV tank destroyer
 Lim-6 ground-attack aircraft
 MiG-21 jet fighter
 Su-7 jet fighter
 Yak-23 jet fighter
 Il-14 transport aircraft
 ORP Odwazny, a Project 664 class torpedo boat

Gallery

References

External links

 
 

Military and war museums in Poland
Museums in Świętokrzyskie Voivodeship
Museums established in 1969
1969 establishments in Poland